Thomas Stelzer (born June 19, 1955) is an Austrian diplomat, who currently serves as the Dean and Executive Secretary of the International Anti-Corruption Academy (IACA).

Education
He holds a doctorate in law from Vienna University, a Master of Arts in Latin American Studies from Stanford University, and a diploma in International Relations from the Johns Hopkins University, School of Advanced International Studies, Bologna Center.

Diplomatic career
Stelzer served in a variety of diplomatic and international positions in his early career. He was Deputy Director of the Austrian Cultural Institute in New York, Special Assistant to the Executive Secretary of the CTBTO Preparatory Commission, and Minister-Counsellor at the Permanent Mission of Austria to the United Nations in New York.  He also serves as the Austrian Representative to the governing bodies of the United Nations Development Programme (UNDP), the United Nations Children’s Fund (UNICEF) and the United Nations Population Fund (UNFPA) and Delegate to the Committee for Disarmament and International Security (First Committee) of the General Assembly.

Stelzer has been serving since August 2001 as Permanent Representative of Austria to the United Nations (Vienna), United Nations Industrial Development Organization (UNIDO), International Atomic Energy Agency (IAEA), and the Comprehensive Nuclear-Test-Ban Treaty Organization (CTBTO) Preparatory Commission.

From 2002 to 2007, he was Facilitator and Chair of the Vienna Terrorism Symposiums. In 2003, he was Chair of the CTBTO Preparatory Commission. Between 2005 and 2006, he served as President of the UNIDO Industrial Development Board. Most recently, he served as a Vice-Chair of the Second Conference of States Parties of the United Nations Convention against Corruption.

From March 2008 to June 2013 he served as United Nations Assistant Secretary-General for Policy Coordination and Inter-Agency Affairs, Department of Economic and Social Affairs. He was appointed to this position by UN Secretary-General Ban Ki-moon in February 2008.

Family life
Stelzer is married to Portuguese fellow diplomat Vanda Stelzer Sequeira, with whom he has three of his children.

Decorations and awards
Stelzer is a member of the Order of Merit of the Austrian Republic.

References

1955 births
Living people
Permanent Representatives of Austria to the United Nations
Austrian officials of the United Nations
Ambassadors of Austria to Portugal
Ambassadors of Austria to Cape Verde